River Line may refer to:

Transportation
River Line / River Subdivision (CSX), a freight rail line incorporating part of the former Conrail line
River Line (Atlanta), the last Atlanta, Georgia streetcar line, which ceased operation in 1949
River Line (Conrail), a rail corridor in New Jersey and New York
River Line (NJ Transit), a light rail line between Trenton and Camden, New Jersey
Riverline (Hobart), a proposed light rail project in Tasmania, Australia.

Other
River trace, the line of a river
Riverbed, the line of a river
River Line (East Sussex), a Site of Special Scientific Interest in East Sussex, England
Riverline (development), a planned development in Chicago
The River Line, a 1964 West German film

See also

 
 
 River (disambiguation)
 Line (disambiguation)